The  was a German government agency based in Berlin which maintained records of members of the former German  who were killed in action, as well as official military records of all military personnel during World War II (ca. 18 million) as well as naval military records since 1871 and other war-related records. Such information is used for civil proceedings, for an official register of war graves, for historical research and as biographical and genealogical purposes.

The agency was established on 26 August 1939 and had been an agency of the state government of Berlin since 1951.  the agency has been merged with the German Federal Archives. The agency is a major source for genealogical and scientific research in various areas.

History

The text of Article 77 is as follows:

The Detaining Powers shall provide all facilities for the transmission, through the Protecting Power or the Central Prisoners of War Agency provided for in Article 123, of instruments, papers or documents intended for prisoners of war or despatched by them, especially powers of attorney and wills.

In all cases they shall facilitate the preparation and execution of such documents on behalf of prisoners of war; in particular, they shall allow them to consult a lawyer and shall take what measures are necessary for the authentication of their signatures.

Headquarters moved several times
In August 1943, the archives were divided in two parts. One part of the WASt was transferred to Saalfeld/Saale in Thuringia, the other part moved to Meiningen, also in Thuringia. It was put under American military authority on 12 April 1945, after their occupation of Thuringia. The American forces moved WASt on 1 July 1945 to Fürstenhagen near Kassel, shortly before the Red Army moved in.
On 14 June 1946, the Allied Control Council devolved some of its role to the French Military Commission.

WASt is now located in Berlin in the Wittenau quarter in the district of Reinickendorf. Its address is Eichborndamm 179.

Data from other archives
WASt integrated documents from other military and paramilitary archives.
In December 1990, it received documents originating from the Potsdam military archive and from the GDR state archive in Dornburg near Zerbst/Anhalt.

WASts archives were swelled by documents from various former army, navy/marine and other archives about casualties, prisoners of war and so on. WASt has now also become an important source for scientific research.

Existing files
The French author Laurent Guillet, a native of Brittany, conducted research on the Franco-German history during World War II. He listed some important documents from the archives of WASt. The information is recorded below to further assist potential users of WASt.

Combatants
WASt maintain a registry in alphabetical order of more than 18 million military and paramilitary participants of World War II.

 and 
 It has 100  million personal data records about transfers of World War II soldiers and airmen and their identity discs.
 It has five million personal documents, e. g. service record books, from soldiers of land and air forces of World War II.

/
 The archive has two million personal files for naval personnel and minesweeping personnel in the period .

War graves

Prisoners of war
 15 million personal data files concerning German, Austrian and their allied soldiers, who were captured in the course of World War II by French, American or British troops. There are also discharge documents of prisoners of war coming back from post-war captivity in the Soviet Union.
 Another 1.5 million files still existing from foreign soldiers who were captured by German forces.

Role of the Deutsche Dienststelle (WASt)
Requests directed to WASt will pass through, according to the wishes of the individual, the following stages:

Alphabetical central data file
Prisoners of war
Marines/Naval forces
War cemeteries
Identification tags
Further external inquiries
Written notices

The Past
Formerly, WASt was tasked with searching for proper documents in order to evaluate old age pensions for German soldiers or their family members who had been left behind. On the other hand, persons who committed war crimes in the German Armed Forces (Wehrmacht), could be identified by this agency.

Future
Today, the Agency is called the Deutsche Dienststelle (WASt) and is part of the administration of Bundesland Berlin. Nowadays, enquiries are often still fruitful; for example, the German War Graves Commission relies in its search for unknown German war graves, among others, on information obtained from them. It can also provide proof of German descent for would-be immigrants looking to resettle from abroad (e.g. from Poland), as establishing a link to an ancestor who served in the German Armed Forces can provide this.

War children whose fathers were German soldiers or German Prisoners of War can also contact the Agency to research the history of their German fathers who were killed, are listed as missing, or are no longer traceable. Such enquiries to WASt derive mainly from France, Norway, Denmark, The Netherlands, and from Finland. In terms of numbers, there are about 500 enquiries per year from war children born in, or slightly after, World War II, with around 110 per year alone from France. This research is often undertaken as part of a genealogical search for their origins, their unknown procreator and relates to those soldiers who were declared missing, killed in action or are untraceable. WASt can also conduct inquiries for the German families of former German soldiers, for example, to find out if a French war child is searching for their father.

References

External links 

   Redirected to German Federal Archives

Archives in Germany
Wehrmacht
Military history of Germany during World War II
Aftermath of World War II in Germany
Historiography of Nazi Germany
 
Organisations based in Berlin